Anthony Joseph Ellis (born 20 October 1964) is an English former professional footballer who commanded combined transfer fees of nearly £750,000 and scored 185 league goals in 518 league games during a sixteen-year Football League career.

Playing career

Oldham Athletic and Preston North End
Born in Salford, Lancashire, Ellis began his playing career in local and non-league football, with Horwich RMI and Northwich Victoria and Poets F.C. in the Salford Sunday League. In August 1986 at the age of 21, Ellis was signed by Joe Royle for Oldham Athletic, for whom he played ten games. Ellis was spotted by Preston North End manager John McGrath scoring goals for Oldham's reserve team. McGrath paid £23,000 in October 1987 to take Ellis to Deepdale, where he scored a last-minute winner on his debut against Port Vale. In his first spell at Deepdale Ellis scored 32 goals in 106 games in a little over two seasons.

Stoke City
In 1989 Alan Ball at Stoke City tabled a £250,000 offer for Ellis. For Preston, the money was too good to turn down, and Ellis found himself leaving for the Victoria Ground in December 1989. His time at Stoke was disrupted by injury and the emergence of both Wayne Biggins and Mark Stein as first choice strikers. However in two and a half years he scored 20 goals in 93 first-team appearances and was a regular scorer for the City reserve team that won the Central League division two titles in 1991-92.

Back at Preston
In August 1992 Preston  resigned  Ellis,  paying Stoke £50,000 plus striker Graham Shaw. Stoke valued Ellis at £250,000 while Preston valued Shaw at £200,000. This deal therefore meant that Ellis became Preston's record signing at the time. His second spell at Preston was even more productive than his first: Ellis scored 56 goals in just 88 games and was named the club's official player of the year in 1992/93 and 1993/94. His final game for the Lilywhites was their 1994 play-off final defeat against Wycombe Wanderers at Wembley. In his two spells at Preston,  Ellis scored 88 goals in 194 games.

Blackpool
After a much-publicised fall out with Preston boss John Beck over a new contract, Ellis signed for arch-rivals Blackpool for £165,000 in 1994. However, in November 1995, Ellis handed in a transfer request fueling rumours of a return to Deepdale, by then managed by Gary Peters. Blackpool got around this problem by offering Ellis an extension to his contract. In three and a half years at Bloomfield Road, Ellis scored 65 goals in 173 games, and was the leading goalscorer for each of his three seasons at the club. One of his strike partners, Andy Preece, included Ellis in his all-time XI in 2021.

Latter career
In December 1997, Ellis was on the move again, this time to Bury for £70,000. He scored twelve goals in 38 games at Gigg Lane. Then in 1999 he joined Stockport County for a fee of £25,000. He made 21 league appearances, scoring six goals before joining Rochdale on a free transfer later that year where he made a total of 68 appearances and scored 18 goals.

He was released by Rochdale at the end of the 2000–01 season, and found himself without a club with semi-retirement and a return to non-league football looked likely until Burnley boss Stan Ternent offered him a lifeline. In his only season at Turf Moor, Ellis played ten games, all as a substitute. At the age of 37 he scored the winner against Bradford City in a 3–2 win at Valley Parade, his only goal for the club. During his Football League career Ellis had scored 210 goals in 609 first team games.

Non-League
After leaving Burnley at the end of the 2001–02 season, Ellis joined Football Conference side Leigh RMI in August 2002. In 2003, he joined Northern Premier League side Mossley.

In 2003–04 he became player/assistant manager of Conference North club Hyde United and also took on the role of coaching the Burnley under-15s at the Turf Moor club's Centre of Excellence.

Coaching career
In July 2007, Ellis left his position as assistant manager of Hyde United and coach of the youth teams at Turf Moor to join former teammate, Rochdale manager Keith Hill, as Head of Youth at Spotland.

Since May 2013, Ellis has been appointed as both Academy Manager and First Team Matchday Observational Coach, which will ensure a bridge between Dale's youth system and the first team.

Blackpool F.C. Hall of Fame
Ellis was inducted into the Hall of Fame at Bloomfield Road, when it was officially opened by former Blackpool player Jimmy Armfield in April 2006. Organised by the Blackpool Supporters Association, Blackpool fans around the world voted on their all-time heroes. Five players from each decade are inducted; Ellis is in the 1990s.

Career statistics
Source:

A.  The "Other" column constitutes appearances and goals in the Football League play-offs, Football League Trophy.

Honours
Individual
 PFA Team of the Year: 1993–94 Third Division

References

Further reading

External links
 
 Ellis in the Blackpool Supporters Association Hall of Fame
 Hyde United Player Statistics: Tony Ellis
 A Q&A with Tony Ellis

1964 births
Footballers from Salford
Living people
English footballers
Association football forwards
Oldham Athletic A.F.C. players
Preston North End F.C. players
Stoke City F.C. players
Blackpool F.C. players
Bury F.C. players
Stockport County F.C. players
Rochdale A.F.C. players
Burnley F.C. players
Leigh Genesis F.C. players
Mossley A.F.C. players
Hyde United F.C. players
English Football League players
Rochdale A.F.C. non-playing staff
Northwich Victoria F.C. players